Eupithecia schwingenschussi is a moth in the family Geometridae. It is found in Morocco.

References

Moths described in 1934
schwingenschussi
Moths of Africa
Endemic fauna of Morocco